Jack Blessing (July 29, 1951 – November 14, 2017) was an American film and television actor. He was notable for his roles as MacGillicuddy on Moonlighting and as Jack Powers in the sitcom George Lopez. He also had a recurring role as Mr. Donner in the television series The Naked Truth.

Early life
Blessing was born and raised in Baltimore, Maryland. He graduated from Calvert Hall High School in 1969, and from Frostburg State University, before serving in the United States Army from 1972 to 1975. At Frostburg, Blessing played the male lead in a fall 1969 college production of Romeo and Juliet. In the Army, he was assigned to the Defense Language Institute in Monterey, California, and to Augsburg, Germany. He later moved to Boston, Massachusetts to begin his acting career. He began his professional career as a member of Boston's seminal improvisational company The Proposition.

Career
In his last year at The Proposition, Blessing was discovered by a Paramount casting director. Afterwards, he had a role in the Emmy Award-winning television film The Defection of Simas Kudirka (1978).

Blessing would soon guest star in The X-Files, Judging Amy, NYPD Blue, Murder One, Home Improvement, and in Everybody Loves Raymond. Blessing had a role in the Will Ferrell comedy Talladega Nights: The Ballad of Ricky Bobby as Jarvis.

Blessing gained national prominence on the hit series Moonlighting in 1986. Later, he recurred as Jack Powers in George Lopez, playing the character in 25 episodes spanning from 2002 through the series' finale in 2007.

In the years following George Lopez, Blessing appeared in smaller roles in Shrek the Third, Megamind, ParaNorman and in Legends of Oz: Dorothy's Return.

Death
Blessing died of pancreatic cancer at his home in Chatsworth, California on November 14, 2017, at the age of 66. He is survived by two sons and his wife.

Filmography

Film

Television

Video games

References

External links
 

1951 births
2017 deaths
American male film actors
American male television actors
American male voice actors
Male actors from Baltimore
Male actors from Maryland
Deaths from pancreatic cancer